Sleep Dirt is 

The song's tone is described as intimate as Frank Zappa's sliding left hand gives it a special flavor. Zappa played a fast paced solo, while Youman played the accompaniment. The track has some of the dreamy intensity of half-conscious perception as Youman falters at the end and Zappa asks, "you getting tired?"; "no, my fingers got stuck."

References

Frank Zappa songs
Song recordings produced by Frank Zappa